The 1992 tournament championship game was played on May 25, 1992, at Franklin Field in front of 13,150 fans. Princeton completed a 13 and 2 season by defeating Syracuse in two overtime, 10-9, to win the Division I Men's Lacrosse Championship.

Tournament overview

The win marked the first NCAA tournament title for Princeton, but seventh overall college lacrosse national championship.

The Tigers upset top-ranked Syracuse who were playing in their fourth Division I final in the prior five years. Syracuse, which had come back from a six goal deficit, lost on Andy Moe's fourth goal of the game nine seconds into the second sudden-death overtime. Princeton won the overtime faceoff with Moe sprinting down the right side for the winning goal. A misplayed clear by Princeton's goalie allowed Tom Marechek to score a virtually empty net goal with 42 seconds left in regulation to tie it.

Princeton had two wins and thirteen losses only five years prior in Bill Tierney's first season as coach.

Tournament results 

 * = Overtime

Tournament boxscores

Tournament Finals

Tournament Semi-finals

Tournament Quarterfinals

Tournament First Round

All-Tournament Team

Scott Bacigalupo, Princeton (Named the tournament's Most Outstanding Player)

References

External links 
YouTube 1992 NCAA Men's Lacrosse National Championship NCAA On Demand
YouTube 1992 NCAA Men's Lacrosse National Championship Andy Moe Game Winner
YouTube 1992 NCAA Men's Lacrosse National Championship Greg Waller Score

NCAA Division I Men's Lacrosse Championship
NCAA Division I Men's Lacrosse Championship
NCAA Division I Men's Lacrosse Championship
NCAA Division I Men's Lacrosse Championship